

Top Division

Group A







Original roster from insidecollegehockey.com



Group B











See also
 2007 World Junior Ice Hockey Championships

References

Roster
World Junior Ice Hockey Championships rosters